Bhandara is a city in Maharashtra, India.

Bhandara may also refer to:

In India:
 Bhandara district
 Bhandara Tehsil
 Bhandara Municipal Council
 Bhandara (Vidhan Sabha constituency)
 Bhandara (Lok Sabha constituency)
 Bhandara, Nepal
 Bhandara (community kitchen), the free community feast in Hindi language
 Bhandarā, a consecrated food offered to Hindu deities in Prasada
 Bhandara (leafhopper), a genus of leafhoppers in the family Cicadellidae

See also 
 Isphanyar M. Bhandara
 Bhandra block, in Jharkhand, India